Ceroprepes fusconebulella is a species of snout moth in the genus Ceroprepes. It was described by Hiroshi Yamanaka and Valentina A. Kirpichnikova in 2000 and is known from Russia.

References

Moths described in 2000
Phycitinae